Marie-Michèle Desrosiers (born March 6, 1950) is a Canadian pop and rock singer from Quebec. She is most noted as a former member of the influential rock group Beau Dommage, and for her album Marie Michèle Desrosiers chante les classiques de Noël, which won the Juno Award for Francophone Album of the Year at the Juno Awards of 1998.

Desrosiers studied piano at Collège Lionel-Groulx and acting at the National Theatre School of Canada before joining Beau Dommage as a singer and keyboardist.

Following the band's breakup in the late 1970s, Desrosiers pursued a solo career, releasing her self-titled debut album in 1980. She released a second album, Plus fort, in 1983 before participating in Beau Dommage's 1984 reunion concert. She followed up in 1985 with Aimer pour aimer, and recorded vocals for François Dompierre's soundtrack to the 1985 film The Alley Cat (Le Matou). Throughout this time she also took a number of acting roles, predominantly in stage and musical theatre.

She participated in the recording of Beau Dommage's reunion album in 1994.

She released Marie Michèle Desrosiers chante les classiques de Noël, her first album of Christmas music, in November 1996. Her most commercially successful album, it sold over 100,000 copies in Quebec within just a few weeks of its release. In addition to the album's Juno Award win, it was a shortlisted finalist for Album of the Year, and Desrosiers for Female Singer of the Year, at the Prix Félix in 1997.

In 2002, she followed up with Marie-Michèle Desrosiers chante Noël avec le choeur de l'Armée rouge, an album recorded in Moscow with the Red Army Choir. Her other albums have included C'est ici que je veux vivre (2000), Mes mélodies du bonheur (2004) and Marie-Michèle se défrise (2008).

She has had supporting roles in films, including Robert Ménard's Exit and Denys Arcand's Days of Darkness (L'Âge des ténèbres). More recently, she has continued to pursue a smaller-scale musical career, touring Quebec to perform Christmas music concerts with church and community choirs.

References

External links

1950 births
Canadian women rock singers
Canadian women pop singers
Canadian musical theatre actresses
French-language singers of Canada
Actresses from Montreal
Singers from Montreal
Juno Award for Francophone Album of the Year winners
French Quebecers
Living people
Canadian women pianists
National Theatre School of Canada alumni
20th-century Canadian actresses
21st-century Canadian actresses
20th-century Canadian women singers
21st-century Canadian women singers
21st-century Canadian pianists
20th-century women pianists
21st-century women pianists